Abdur Rahim Ahmed is an Indian politician. He was elected to the Assam Legislative Assembly from Barpeta in the 2021 Assam Legislative Assembly election as a member of the Indian National Congress.

References 

Indian National Congress politicians from Assam
Year of birth missing (living people)
Living people
Place of birth missing (living people)